The 1982 ABN World Tennis Tournament was a tennis tournament played on indoor carpet courts at the Rotterdam Ahoy in the Netherlands. It was part of the 1982 Volvo Grand Prix circuit. It was the 10th edition of the tournament and was held from 15 March through 21 March 1982. Second-seeded Guillermo Vilas won the singles title.

Finals

Singles

 Guillermo Vilas defeated  Jimmy Connors 0–6, 6–2, 6–4

Doubles
 Mark Edmondson /  Sherwood Stewart defeated  Fritz Buehning /  Kevin Curren 7–5, 6–2

References

External links
 Official website 
 Official website 
 ATP tournament profile
 ITF tournament details

 
ABN World Tennis Tournament
1982 in Dutch tennis